Protein Engineering Design & Selection is a publication of Oxford University Press. Created in 1986, the Journal covers topics related the engineering, design and selection of proteins for use in biotechnology and therapy, and for understanding the fundamental link between protein sequence, structure, dynamics, function, and evolution.

Abstracting and indexing
Protein Engineering Design & Selection is indexed in Biological Abstracts, BIOSIS Previews, Biotechnology and Bioengineering Abstracts, Biotechnology Citation Index, CAB Abstracts, Chemical Abstracts, Current Contents, EMBASE, Environmental Science and Pollution Management, Food Science and Technology Abstracts, Journal Citation Reports, ProQuest, and Science Citation Index. According to the latest Journal Citation Reports, the journal has a 2019 impact factor of 1.774, ranking it 247th out of 297 in the category "Biochemistry & Molecular Biology" and 120th out of 156 in the category "Biotechnology & Applied Microbiology".

References

External links 
 Journal homepage
 Submission website

Oxford University Press
Molecular and cellular biology journals
Hybrid open access journals
Publications established in 1980
Oxford University Press academic journals
Monthly journals